The dark sheath-tailed bat (Mosia nigrescens) is a species of sac-winged bat in the family Emballonuridae. It is the only species in the genus Mosia. It is found in Indonesia, Papua New Guinea, and the Solomon Islands.

References

Emballonuridae
Bats of Oceania
Mammals of Papua New Guinea
Mammals of Western New Guinea
Mammals of the Solomon Islands
Mammals described in 1843
Taxonomy articles created by Polbot
Taxa named by John Edward Gray
Bats of New Guinea